Rouen Museum may refer to
 Musée des Beaux-Arts de Rouen, a fine arts museum
 Muséum d'Histoire Naturelle de Rouen, a natural history museum
 Maritime, Fluvial and Harbour Museum of Rouen, a museum dedicated to the history of the port of Rouen